Rosaline Fox may refer to

 The mother and victim of matricide Sidney Harry Fox
 The wife of Alan Collins